Asia Molly Vieira (born May 18, 1982) is a Canadian actress best known for her early role in the 1991 made-for-television Omen IV: The Awakening and playing as Christine Harrison in the Disney Channel original series, Flash Forward.

Early life and education 
Born in Toronto, Ontario, Canada, she began her career as a child model at the age of four, later gaining her first major role in 1988 alongside Diane Keaton and Liam Neeson in The Good Mother. She is an accomplished gymnast and graduated from the Etobicoke School of the Arts as a Music Theatre Major. She was also a student at the University of Toronto, studying both drama and history.

Career 
Vieira has starred in numerous made-for-TV movies and popular television shows, but she is probably best known for playing the roles of Jewel Staite's best friend Christine Harrison in the TV series Flash Forward, Sally in The Adventures of Dudley the Dragon and Delia York, daughter of Damien Thorn, in Omen IV: The Awakening. She has recently been recording for both radio and cartoons, along with appearing in a number of made-for-TV movies and short films including I Am an Apartment Building which won Best Canadian short at the Edmonton Short Film Festival.

Filmography

Film

Television

References

External links

1982 births
Canadian child actresses
Canadian film actresses
Canadian television actresses
Actresses from Toronto
Living people